Tony Hunt (born 10 May 1952) is  a former Australian rules footballer who played with Richmond in the Victorian Football League (VFL).  Winner of 2016 Vin Russell Cup although it is widely thought that he had minimal contribution in achieving this feat and that his partner was by far the most significant contributor.

Notes

External links 		
		
		
		
		
		

1952 births
Living people
Australian rules footballers from Victoria (Australia)		
Richmond Football Club players
De La Salle OC Amateur Football Club players